Oracular Spectacular is the debut studio album by the American band MGMT, released on October 2, 2007, by RED Ink and physically on January 22, 2008, by Columbia. It was produced by Dave Fridmann and is the band's first release of new content, being recorded from March to April 2007. Promotion for the album started as early as June 2007, when the song "Weekend Wars" was given away in summer issues of free monthly magazine Nöjesguiden in Stockholm, Sweden. Matching CDs could be picked up for free in all stores in three different shopping malls around Stockholm from June 26 to July 31. The album was also promoted with three singles: "Time to Pretend", "Electric Feel" and "Kids". Both "Time to Pretend" and "Kids" were re-recorded for the album; they were originally included on the band's previous release Time to Pretend (2005), with the opening track serving as a "mission statement" and the theme continuing through the album's subsequent tracks.

Although Oracular Spectacular never sold more than 17,000 units in a week, at least 2,000 copies per week were sold during the period from January 2008 through April 2010. The album received positive reviews from critics, who lauded its production style, musical direction and composition. It was nominated for the International Album award at the 2009 Brit Awards. In 2012, Rolling Stone ranked the album at number 494 on its list of The 500 Greatest Albums of All Time.

Background
The duo recorded with music producer Dave Fridmann in 2007 for their major label debut, Oracular Spectacular. MGMT opened for Of Montreal on tour in autumn 2007 as a five-piece touring band including Matthew Asti (bass), James Richardson (drums), and Hank Sullivant (guitar).

Promotion for the album started as early as June 2007, when the song "Weekend Wars" was given away in summer issues of free monthly magazine Nöjesguiden in Stockholm, Sweden. Matching CDs could be picked up for free in all stores in three different shopping malls around Stockholm from June 26 to July 31.

In November 2007, they performed for the first time in Europe, supporting the band Samantha and The Courteeners at Koko in London, England. After March 2008, Hank Sullivant left the band to pursue his own band, Kuroma. Will Berman joined as the new drummer, James Richardson switched from drums to guitar, and Matthew Asti remained on bass.

The album was also promoted with three singles: "Time to Pretend", "Electric Feel" and "Kids".

Reception

Oracular Spectacular has received mostly positive reviews. Jason Lymangrover of AllMusic called Oracular Spectaculars tracks "some of the catchiest pop songs to come from NYC since the turn of the millennium" and stated that "the songs never feel insincere and the record is inherently strong throughout, making it a solid start to their career." Prefix Magazine described the album as "a college-dorm experiment gone horribly right." Giving the album a three-star honorable mention rating, Robert Christgau stated that "like Vampire Weekend, only as synth-dance rather than indie-rock, they convert a quality liberal education into thoughtful, anxious, faux-lite pop."

In a mixed review, PopMatters Matt Fiander criticized the second half of the album, writing, "The second half of the record settles into a more monotone kind of space rock that is as big as the better first half, but gives us no recognizably distinct songs or catchy melodies." The album was named as the best album of 2008 by NME. In 2009, Rolling Stone named it the 18th-best album of the decade, and in 2012 the magazine included it at number 494 on its list of the 500 greatest albums of all time, saying, "Two hipster geeks get some rad vintage keyboards and compose a suite of synthesized heartache".

The album has a Metacritic score of 76 out of 100 on based on 22 critics, indicating "generally favorable reviews".

Track listing

Notes
An earlier recording of "Time to Pretend" appeared on Time to Pretend EP.
An earlier recording of "Kids" appeared on We (Don't) Care, Climbing to New Lows and Time to Pretend EP.

Personnel
 Andrew VanWyngarden – lead vocals, lead and rhythm guitars, synthesizers, bass guitar, drums, percussion
 Ben Goldwasser – keyboards, synthesizers, sampling, rhythm guitar, percussion, backing vocals

Charts

Weekly charts

Year-end charts

Certifications

<//ref>

Awards

References

External links
 

2007 debut albums
Columbia Records albums
MGMT albums
Albums produced by Dave Fridmann
Albums recorded at Tarbox Road Studios